Justin Croft (born 1968) is a British antiquarian bookseller and an expert in books and manuscripts on the BBC's Antiques Roadshow, which he joined in 2005. 
 
He is a member of the Antiquarian Booksellers' Association and has been a member of the teaching faculty of the York Antiquarian Book Seminar since 2014. 
 
He holds a PhD in Medieval Studies from the University of Kent, Canterbury, awarded in 1997 for a study of book production in English medieval towns. 
 
He lives and works in Faversham, Kent.

References

1968 births
Living people